Moms Clean Air Force is a nonprofit, grassroots environmental advocacy group, based in the United States, which focuses on protecting children from air pollution. It has chapters in 26 states and more than a million members, and is politically neutral or, in its own words, "mom-partisan". It was co-founded in 2011 by Dominique Browning in partnership with Hanne Grantham and Sue Mandel of the Environmental Defense Fund (EDF). It also campaigns on related issues such as toxic chemicals and climate change. Recent campaigns have included calling for the electrification of diesel school buses and supporting President Joe Biden's Build Back Better Plan.

References

External links
 
Environmental organizations based in the United States
Environmental organizations established in 2011
Air pollution organizations